3-Hydroxyflavone is a chemical compound. It is the backbone of all flavonols, a type of flavonoid. It is a synthetic compound, which is not found naturally in plants. It serves as a model molecule as it possesses an excited-state intramolecular proton transfer (ESIPT) effect to serve as a fluorescent probe to study membranes for example or intermembrane proteins. The green tautomer emission (λmax ≈ 524 nm) and blue-violet normal emission (λmax ≈ 400 nm) originate from two different ground state populations of 3HF molecules. The phenomenon also exists in natural flavonols. Although 3-hydroxyflavone is almost insoluble in water, its aqueous solubility  (hence bio-availability) can be increased by encapsulation in cyclodextrin cavities.

Synthesis
The Algar-Flynn-Oyamada reaction is a chemical reaction whereby a chalcone undergoes an oxidative cyclization to form a flavonol.

References

Flavonols